The Moose Hunt is a Mickey Mouse short animated film first released on April 30, 1931, as part of the Mickey Mouse film series. It was the twenty-eighth Mickey Mouse short to be produced, and the fourth of 1931.

This is the first cartoon to feature Pluto as Mickey's pet – in his previous appearance, 1930's The Picnic, he was called "Rover" and lived with Minnie Mouse. The cartoon is dominated by Pluto's antics; he gets a minute and a half of solo screen time.

Pluto speaks three times in the cartoon – crying "Mammy!", telling Mickey to "Kiss me!" and pointing out "The moose!" Except for one more "mammy" at the end of Mickey Steps Out, Pluto never speaks again.

Plot
Mickey Mouse takes his dog Pluto into the woods for a hunting trip. Pluto is distracted by a flea, and sniffs around the forest, getting bitten on the nose by a bird. He examines a raggedy scarecrow, and is frightened when one of the scarecrow's gloves lands on his tail. He flees – knocking Mickey over – and jumps in the water. When he emerges, more fleas climb onto his back.

Pluto returns to Mickey, who runs him through a series of dog commands – lay down, roll over, sit up and shake hands. When Mickey tells Pluto to "speak", Pluto does a brief Al Jolson impression, kneeling with outstretched paws and saying "Mammy!".

Mickey throws a stick for Pluto, who picks up a larger branch and carries it back to his master. Seeing the antler-like twigs in silhouette, Mickey thinks that Pluto's a moose, and he shoots. He finds Pluto lying motionless, and starts to cry, sobbing, "Oh, what have I done? Don't leave me, pal!" Pluto winks at the audience, as Mickey continues to cry. When Mickey begs him to say something, Pluto looks at him sweetly, and growls, "Kiss me!".

Mickey's delighted that Pluto's alive, but they hear a moose call and immediately return to the hunting trip. Pluto sniffs around, but completely misses the moose, who starts snuffling after Pluto instead. Pluto taps Mickey on the shoulder, points at the moose, and barks, "The moose! The moose!" Mickey tries to shoot the enormous moose, but his hands shake so much that his gun falls to pieces. The moose chases Mickey and Pluto, but Mickey uses Pluto's flapping ears to get airborne, and they triumphantly fly away, Mickey riding on his dog's back.

Production
This short is the first of six that features Mickey hunting; the theme lasts until R'coon Dawg in 1951.

It includes some recycled animation of Pluto sniffing near the camera from the 1930 short The Chain Gang.

Reception
On the 2004 Walt Disney Treasures DVD set Mickey Mouse in Black and White: Volume Two, The Moose Hunt is in the bonus-features "From the Vault" section, which begins with an introduction by film historian Leonard Maltin explaining the origins of racial stereotypes seen in Disney cartoons of the 1930s and 1940s. The Moose Hunt is included in that group because of Pluto's "Mammy!" impression, which refers to Al Jolson's famous blackface performance, "My Mammy". The 1929 short The Haunted House is also included in that section because of a similar gag featuring Mickey.

In Mickey's Movies: The Theatrical Films of Mickey Mouse, Gijs Grob writes: "Its pace is slow, and it contains some awkward gags, like the flying Pluto finale. Most interestingly, the short features a rare gag breaking the fourth dimension: when Mickey accidentally shoots Pluto, he suddenly addresses the audience with "Is there a doctor in the house?" Such a self-conscious audience gag would remain a rarity at Disney, but it would become a staple gag at Warner Bros. after Tex Avery joined that studio."

On the Disney Film Project, Ryan Kilpatrick points out that Pluto gets more and better gags than Mickey, who was starting to become a more limited character: "Pluto acts just like a dog when he encounters a scarecrow, sniffing around it carefully, waiting for his moment to pounce. Mickey could not have done this, as we would expect him to be more sophisticated. But Pluto’s innocence allows for a new range of gags. The Moose Hunt really shows the direction that the Mickey cartoons are heading. Mickey is the framework for the side characters to do great and funny little bits. This would really come to fruition in the color shorts, like Lonesome Ghosts or Clock Cleaners, but it starts back in 1930-1931.

Motion Picture Herald (May 30, 1931): "Here is a great little cartoon comedy number, with Mickey Mouse himself featured in the stellar role of moose hunter. Only the moose turns around and proceeds to hunt Mickey and his hound. The lines are sure-fire and the synchronization touches the Disney par, which is sufficient. Birds, fleas and a skunk for good measure supply the atmosphere. A fine laugh number. Play it, of course."

Variety (June 9, 1931): "Of the Mickey Mouse series and good. Will please anywhere. This time Mickey Mouse is aided by a sniffing hound. The two are out amid whistling trills and music accompaniment on a moose hunt. Hound draws laughs by his sniffling, and as he keeps his nose to the ground and is annoyed by fleas. Before the windup the two do meet a moose. Mickey's gun won't work. Usual chase but it winds okay when Mickey picks up the dog's tail and makes the hound fly through the air to safety. Before that he almost popped the dog dead when he mistook him for an antelope."

The Film Daily (June 14, 1931): "Swell: Right up to the high average on the Mickey Mouse cartoon series. As the title implies, the antics in this case have to do with a moose hunt. Mickey is accompanied by a flea-bitten hound and there is a lot of comedy business dealing with the search for a moose and the failure of the gun to go off when the animal is at bay. There is a fast chase finish, with Mickey and the hound coming winners after a narrow escape. Art work and music excellent."

Voice cast
 Mickey Mouse: Walt Disney
 Pluto: Pinto Colvig
 Moose: ???

Home media
The short was released on December 7, 2004, on Walt Disney Treasures: Mickey Mouse in Black and White, Volume Two: 1929-1935.

Television
It was included on the TV show The Mickey Mouse Club (Season 2, Episode 77).

See also
Mickey Mouse (film series)

References

External links
 
 

Mickey Mouse short films
1930s Disney animated short films
1931 short films
American black-and-white films
1931 animated films
1931 films
Films produced by Walt Disney
American comedy short films
Columbia Pictures short films
Columbia Pictures animated short films
Films directed by Burt Gillett
Films about hunters
1930s English-language films
1930s American films